The Borribles Go For Broke is the second volume of the Borrible Trilogy, written by Michael de Larrabeiti and first published in 1981 by The Bodley Head in the United Kingdom.

The book is currently available in the UK as part of The Borrible Trilogy, which was reissued in one trade paperback volume in 2002 by Pan Macmillan and in paperback by Tor UK in 2003. In the United States the book is currently available as an individual volume, published by Tor in 2005.

Plot summary
Borribles are runaway children whose ears become pointed as they take to the streets, indicators of their independence and intelligence. As long as their ears remain unclipped they will never age; for this reason, they wear woollen hats pulled low over their ears in order to remain undetected by the authorities, who find their freedom threatening to the social order. Borribles are skinny, scruffy, and tough; they have nothing to do with money, and steal what they need to survive.

Following on from the adventures of The Great Rumble Hunt, the second volume of The Borrible Trilogy begins with the surviving adventurers discovery that Sam the horse is still alive. In attempting to rescue him the Borribles are lured into danger both by the newly-established Special Borrible Group, a branch of the police determined to wipe out the Borribles and their way of life, and by one of their own – Spiff, whose motives behind the mission to Rumbledom are slowly revealed.

All this leads the Borribles deep in to Wendle territory beneath the streets of Wandsworth, and down in to a shifting tunnel of mud dug deep beneath the mudflats of the Wandle River.

Film adaptation
While a July 2004 report in Variety revealed that a film based on the entire trilogy was being developed by CUBA Pictures, the film development arm of literary agents Curtis Brown,  no such film can be found at IMDb, Variety Insight, nor other such online databases of information related to films.

Reception
David Langford reviewed The Borribles Go For Broke in the May 1984 issue of White Dwarf, stating:

Reviews
Review by Jeff Frane (1982) in Locus, #254 March 1982
Review by Fred D'Ignazio (1982) in Science Fiction & Fantasy Book Review, #4, May 1982
Review by Kevin K. Rattan (1982) in Paperback Inferno, Volume 6, Number 1
Review by Debbie Notkin (1982) in Rigel Science Fiction, #5 Fall 1982
Review by Paul McGuire (1982) in Science Fiction Review, Winter 1982

References
de Larrabeiti, Michael. The Borrible Trilogy. (London: Tor, 2003). UK edition - 
de Larrabeiti, Michael. The Borribles Go For Broke. (Tor, 2005). US Edition -

External links
Free PDF of the first chapter of The Borribles Go For Broke

See also
The Borribles - the first volume of The Borrible Trilogy
The Borribles: Across the Dark Metropolis - the third volume of The Borrible Trilogy

1981 British novels
Books by Michael de Larrabeiti
British fantasy novels
The Bodley Head books